Horten Peak is a small rock peak,  high, rising south of the summit of Risemedet Mountain in the Gjelsvik Mountains of Queen Maud Land, Antarctica. It was mapped by Norwegian cartographers from surveys and air photos by the Sixth Norwegian Antarctic Expedition (1956–60) and named by them.

References

Mountains of Queen Maud Land
Princess Martha Coast